Wolf Creek Generating Station, a nuclear power plant located near Burlington, Kansas, occupies 9,818 acres (40 km²) of the total  controlled by the owner.  Wolf Creek, dammed to create Coffey County Lake (formerly Wolf Creek Lake), provides not only the name, but water for the condensers.

History
This plant has one Westinghouse pressurized water reactor that came on line on June 4, 1985. The reactor was rated at 1,170 MW(e). A new turbine generator rotor was installed in 2011 that increased electrical output to approximately 1250 MW(e).  The reactor output remained unchanged at 3565 MW (th).

On October 4, 2006, the operator applied to the Nuclear Regulatory Commission (NRC) for a renewal and extension of the plant's operating license. 
The NRC granted the renewal on November 20, 2008, extending the license from forty years to sixty.

On Jan 13, 2012 at 2 p.m., due to a breaker failure and an unexplained loss of power to an electrical transformer, the plant experienced an automatic reactor trip and loss of offsite power that lasted 3 hours.

The nuclear plant was a target of an unsuccessful cyberattack by hackers in 2017, leading to indictments in 2021.

Electricity Generation

Ownership
The Wolf Creek Nuclear Operating Corporation, a Delaware corporation, operates the power plant.
The ownership is divided between  the Evergy (94%), and Kansas Electric Power Cooperative, Inc. (6%).

Surrounding population

The 2010 U.S. population within  of Wolf Creek was 5,466, a decrease of 2.8 percent in a decade, according to an analysis of U.S. Census data for msnbc.com. The 2010 U.S. population within  was 176,656, a decrease of 1.7 percent since 2000. Cities within 50 miles include Emporia (30 miles to city center).

Seismic risk
The Nuclear Regulatory Commission's estimate of the risk each year of an earthquake intense enough to cause core damage to the reactor at Wolf Creek was 0.0019%, or 1 in 55,556, according to an NRC study published in August 2010.

References

External links

 Official Website
 Old Official Website (Archived)  (404)
 Energy Information Administration, U.S. Department of Energy (DOE):
 Wolf Creek Nuclear Power Plant, Kansas (April 26, 2012) 
 Kansas (estimates) (version February 16, 2017) 
 Wolf Creek Nuclear Power Plant Tourism
 

Energy infrastructure completed in 1985
Buildings and structures in Coffey County, Kansas
Nuclear power plants in Kansas
Nuclear power stations using pressurized water reactors
Evergy
1985 establishments in Kansas